O'Quinn is an unincorporated community in unincorporated central Fayette County, Texas, United States. O'Quinn is the birthplace of Rear Admiral John Weldon Koenig.

External links
 O'QUINN, TX Handbook of Texas Online.

Unincorporated communities in Fayette County, Texas
Unincorporated communities in Texas